Junior Joao Maleck Robles (born 13 March 1999) is a Mexican professional footballer who plays as a forward for Liga de Expansión MX club Tepatitlán, on loan from Santos Laguna.

Legal issues

On the morning of 23 June 2019, Maleck was involved in a fatal car crash in his hometown, Guadalajara, that resulted in the death of a newlywed couple. Maleck was driving over the speed limit and was under the influence of alcohol when his vehicle hit the car of the victims. On 23 October 2020, Maleck was found guilty of two counts of aggravated homicide. On 30 October, Maleck was sentenced to three years, eight months and 15 days in prison and ordered to pay a fine of 3 million pesos (US$141,600). Despite the sentence, the law states that Maleck could be released from prison in just 15 days provided he pays the fines. On 15 December, Maleck was released on parole after spending 18 months in prison. He was released after serving less than half of his sentence and posting a $151,121 bond.

At the time of the accident, Maleck was on loan at Sevilla Atlético of the second division B of Spanish football; the club announced it would terminate its working relationship with the player on 30 June. While in prison, Maleck signed a contract extension with Santos Laguna and was later registered with the U-20 team.

Personal life

Maleck is of Cameroonian descent. His father is Jean-Claude Maleck a former footballer who played for Tecos UAG and San Luis.

See also

Afro-Mexicans

References

External links
Joao Maleck at Flashscores 
Joao Maleck at Soccerway 
Joao Maleck at UEFA Profile

1999 births
Living people
Mexican footballers
Mexico under-20 international footballers
Mexico youth international footballers
Association football forwards
Mexican people of Cameroonian descent
FC Porto B players
Sevilla Atlético players
Deportivo CAFESSA Jalisco footballers
Mexican expatriate footballers
Expatriate footballers in Portugal
Expatriate footballers in Spain
Footballers from Guadalajara, Jalisco